Curious Pictures (stylized as curious?ictures) was an American animation studio and multi-media company that was primarily based in New York City that produced television programs, commercials, animation, and video games. The company is known for its flagship work such as the preschool television series A Little Curious for HBO, Little Einsteins for Playhouse Disney, and Team Umizoomi for Nickelodeon. Other well-known works include Sheep in the Big City and Codename: Kids Next Door for Cartoon Network.

History 
After working at Stowmar Enterprises, Steve Oakes and Peter Rosentheal co-founded Broadcast Arts in Washington, D.C. in 1981. One of the company's first assignment was a series of network IDs for MTV, which had set the standard for the network's irreverent humour. This success established the fledgling studio and brought them projects for WPLJ, Showtime, Cinemax, ABC, and more. Broadcast Arts moved to New York City in 1985. Broadcast Arts produced hundreds of commercials, constantly weaving together multiple animation and special effects techniques for various projects, as well as the animation for the first season of Pee-wee's Playhouse. Broadcast Arts changed its name to Curious Pictures in 1993.

Having worked together for several years, the team of five partners, Susan Holden, Steve Oakes, David Starr, Peter Rosentheal, and Richard Winkler, continued producing television commercials, with the intention of expanding to television programming, toy production, and other ventures. In 1994, the company expanded into a 25,000 square-foot studio in Lower Manhattan, fully equipping it with a cel and computer animation department, a shooting stage with two motion control camera systems, a prop and model shop, and digital editing rooms. From 1995 to 1999, an office was maintained in San Francisco to support the company's expansion into animated television series.
In 1998, A Little Curious for HBO became the company's first half-hour series, followed soon after by another project, Sheep in the Big City, for Cartoon Network. Other television animated prod included Codename: Kids Next Door, created by Mr. Warburton, for Cartoon Network, Little Einsteins for the Playhouse Disney, and the last show is Team Umizoomi for Nickelodeon.

Filmography

Television series
MaxTrax (bumpers; 1984)
The George Michael Sports Machine (main titles; 1984)
Pee-wee's Playhouse (season 1 only; 1986)
The Off-Beats (1996–1999)
Elmo's World (season 1 only; 1999)
A Little Curious (1999–2000)
The Cartoon Cartoon Show ("Prickles the Cactus" and "Sheep in the Big City") (2000)
Sheep in the Big City (2000–2002)
Saturday TV Funhouse ("The Narrator That Ruined Christmas") (2001)
Cyberchase (original main character designs; 2002–present)
Hey Joel (2003)
Codename: Kids Next Door (2002–2008)
The Wrong Coast (2004)
Sunday Pants ("Freshman Clowns") (2005)
Little Einsteins (2005–2009)
Mickey Mouse Clubhouse (2006-2016)
Bored to Death (main titles; 2009–2011)
Team Umizoomi (2010–2015)
NFL Rush Zone (2010–2011)
Eureka ("Do You See What I See") (2011)
A Day in the Life (opening animation; 2011)

Films and specials
Star Trek: The Motion Picture (graphic display animation; 1979)
I Go Pogo (1980)
Who's That Girl (title sequence; 1987)
Vandemonium Plus (1987)
Norman's Corner (1987)
Bite & Smile (1989)
The Jackie Bison Show (1990)
Smoke Alarm (1996)
An Off-Beats Valentine's (1999)
Cyberchase: The Poddleville Case (1999)
My Scene: Jammin' in Jamaica (2004)
My Scene: Masquerade Madness (2004)
My Scene Goes Hollywood: The Movie (2005)
PollyWorld (2006)
The Barbie Diaries (2006)
The Buddy Movie: Into The Planet (2006)
Codename: Kids Next Door: Operation Z.E.R.O. (2006)
Chicago 10 (animation; 2007)
The Grim Adventures of the KND (co-produced with Cartoon Network Studios; 2007)
Where in the World Is Osama bin Laden? (graphic design; 2008)
August (additional visual effects; 2008)
Codename: Kids Next Door: Operation: I.N.T.E.R.V.I.E.W.S. (2008)
The Love Guru (graphics and visual effects; 2008)
Little Spirit: Christmas in New York (2008)
Black Swan (motion capture; 2010)
It's Kind of a Funny Story (visual effects; 2010)

Video games
 Rock Band (motion capture and animation; 2007)
 Rock Band 2 (motion capture and animation; 2008)
 Grey's Anatomy: The Video Game (2009)
 The Beatles: Rock Band (2009)
 Grand Theft Auto: The Ballad of Gay Tony (2009)
 Red Dead Redemption (2010)
 Green Day: Rock Band (2010)
 Dance Central (2010)
 Homefront (2011)
 Dance Central 2 (2011)
 Leela (2011)

Shorts
"Don't Answer Me" (music video; 1984)
Foil Man (assisting only; 1995)
The Louie and Louie Show (1996)
Cartoon Network Shorties (1998)
Life (special thanks; 1999)

American animation studios
Companies based in New York (state)
Mass media companies established in 1978
Mass media companies disestablished in 2015
Defunct film and television production companies of the United States